Melaghlin Reagh Ua Seachnasaigh (died 1179) was an Irish Chief of the Name.

Ó Seachnasaigh was the first bearer of the surname to be listed as of Cenél Áeda na hEchtge. However, the territory seems to have been contended with the Ó Cathail family. The Annals of the Four Masters record, sub anno 1179:

Melaghlin Reagh O'Shaughnessy, Lord of half the territory of Kinelea, was killed by the son of Donough O'Cahill.

He was a descendant of Seachnasach mac Donnchadh.

References

 http://www.ucc.ie/celt/published/T100005C/
 John O'Donovan. The Genealogies, Tribes, and Customs of Hy-Fiachrach. Dublin: Irish Archaeological Society. 1844. Pedigree of O'Shaughnessy: pp. 372–91.
 Galway: History and Society, 1996

Medieval Gaels from Ireland
People from County Galway
Melaghlin
12th-century Irish people
1179 deaths
Irish lords
Year of birth unknown